James Moriarty may refer to:

People
 James Moriarty (bishop) (1936–2022), Bishop Emeritus of the Roman Catholic Diocese of Kildare and Leighlin
 James F. Moriarty (born 1953), United States diplomat and career foreign service officer
 James F. Moriarty (USMC) (1896–1981), United States Marine Corps general
 James R. Moriarty (born 1946), American lawyer noted for mass torts against major corporations
 Jim Moriarty (born 1953), New Zealand actor
 Jim Moriarty (luger) (born 1941), American Olympic luger

Characters
 Count Jim Moriarty, fictional character from the 1950s BBC Radio comedy The Goon Show
 Professor Moriarty, fictional character and the archenemy of the detective Sherlock Holmes